The Department of Agriculture and Fisheries is a department of the Queensland Government which aims to maximise the economic potential for Queensland's primary industries on a sustainable basis through strategic industrial development. The section known as Biosecurity Queensland is responsible for biosecurity matters within the state.

The department was formerly known (with varying responsibilities) as:
 Department of Agriculture (17 June 1887 – 1 January 1904)
 Department of Agriculture and Stock (1 January 1904 – 26 September 1963)
 Department of Primary Industries (26 September 1963–26 February1996)
 Department of Primary Industries, Fisheries and Forestry (26  February 1996 – 29 June 1998)
 Department of Primary Industries (29 June 1998 – 12 February 2004)
 Department of Primary Industries and Fisheries (12 February 2004 – 25 March 2009)
 Department of Employment, Economic Development and Innovation (25 March 2009 – 3 April 2012)
 Department of Agriculture, Fisheries and Forestry (3 April 2012 – 16 February 2015)
after which it assumed its current identity Department of Agriculture and Fisheries.

Functions

Agriculture, Fisheries and Forestry  provides expertise and support that increases primary industries productivity, expands markets and assists with adaption to change. It conducts research, policy advice, protects against pests and diseases, maintains animal welfare standards, as well as managing fisheries.

History
The first functions of Agriculture, Fisheries and Forestry began in 1855 when a sheep scab inspector began work in the New South Wales colony of Moreton Bay. After Queensland's Separation, livestock diseases were addressed through regulations administered by the Stock Branch in the Queensland Colonial Secretary's Office. The Stock Branch was established by the Queensland chief inspector of stock Patrick Robertson Gordon.

Biosecurity

The Biosecurity Queensland section is responsible for coordinating efforts to minimise the risks and effects of threatening pests and diseases. Biosecurity Queensland is responsible for weed management in the state.

In 2009, Biosecurity Queensland was successful in its attempt to eradicate a citrus canker outbreak in Central Queensland.

The Tree of Knowledge was successfully cloned in 2008 by workers at the former Department of Primary Industries.
 
The overarching federal legislation, Biosecurity Act 2015, the state's Biosecurity Act 2014, and the Queensland Biosecurity Strategy 2018-2023 govern and guide the department's responsibilities with regard to biosecurity.

Research
In 2009, Primary Industries and Fisheries (now Agriculture, Fisheries and Forestry) together with the University of Queensland were granted federal funding to study how methane emissions from cattle and sheep could be reduced.

Publications
From 1897 to 1921 the department published the Queensland Agricultural Journal.

Notable staff 
 George Alexander Currie, agricultural scientist
 Alexandre Arsène Girault, entomologist
 Ernest James Goddard, science coordinator
 Bela "Bert" Grof, agricultural researcher
 Christopher Sheehy, dairy administrator
 Lindsay Stuart Smith, botanist

See also

2007 Australian equine influenza outbreak
Animal Research Institute, Yeerongpilly
List of common weeds of Queensland
Queensland State Soils Collection

References

External links

Agriculture and Fisheries
Agriculture in Queensland
Queensland
Queensland